Federico Corriente Córdoba (14 November 1940 – 16 June 2020) was a Spanish Arabist, lexicographer, academic and member of the Royal Spanish Academy.

Corriente was born in Granada on 14 November 1940. He died in Zaragoza on 16 June 2020 at the age of 79.

References

1940 births
2020 deaths
Spanish Arabists
Spanish lexicographers
Linguists from Spain
People from Granada